Paratropes bilunata is a species of cockroach within the family Ectobiidae, that can be found in Costa Rica and Panama.

References 

Insects described in 1893
Cockroaches
Insects of Central America